Ario Bayu Wicaksono (born 6 February 1985) is an Indonesian actor.

Early life and career 
Born in Jakarta to Javanese parents, Ario Bayu had spent nearly all of his formative years in the city of Hamilton, New Zealand, where his father studied and then went into business. He returned to Indonesia in 2004 with the intent to pursue his acting and music ambitions.

He studied at the Globe Theatre in London.

In his first break through role, Ario Bayu plays a detective  in Dead Time: Kala, Indonesia's first tribute to film noir which won rave reviews from critics, directed by Joko Anwar.

In 2013, Ario played alongside Hollywood actress Joan Chen in HBO Asia's production Serangoon Road.

In Java Heat, Ario plays opposite Kellan Lutz and Oscar nominee Mickey Rourke.

In Soekarno: Indonesia Merdeka, Ario plays the protagonist Sukarno.

Filmography

Film

Television series

Awards and nominations

References 

General sources
https://archive.today/20130620121255/http://www.thejakartapost.com/news/2010/06/11/he%E2%80%99s-got-look.html
http://www.hollywoodreporter.com/news/hbo-asia-original-series-serangoon-415005

External links 
 

Male actors from Jakarta
1985 births
Living people
Javanese people
Indonesian expatriates in New Zealand
Indonesian actors
Indonesian models